Luxi County is a county in the west of Jiangxi province, China. It is under the jurisdiction of the prefecture-level city of Pingxiang.

Administrative divisions
Luxi County is divided to 5 towns and 5 townships.
5 towns

5 townships

Demographics 

References

County-level divisions of Jiangxi